Nicolas and Bruno are a duo of French film directors, screenwriters, Dialogues and actors, composed of Nicolas Charlet and Bruno Lavaine. They owe their fame to their comedies Message à caractère informatif and In Search Of The Ultra-Sex, for their feature films Me Two and The Big Bad Wolf, and their screenplay of Frédéric Beigbeder's novel 99 francs starring Jean Dujardin. They wrote and directed the French version of Ricky Gervais' The Office and an original French version of Taika Waititi and Jemaine Clement's What We Do in the Shadows.

Career 
Nicolas and Bruno began writing and directing music videos and commercials in the 1990s, including an award-winning commercial for chocolates "Daim" they wrote with Frédéric Beigbeder for Young & Rubicam. Then they worked with French TV producer Thierry Ardisson writing the concept and creating the design of the TV channel Free One.

In 1997, they created Amour, gloire et débats d'idées, a series of sketches broadcast in Le Vrai Journal' on Canal +, in which they overdub a Venezuelan telenovela whose characters tear each other to pieces about French current political events.

In September 1998, the first Message à caractère informatif is broadcast in the famous TV show Nulle part ailleurs on Canal +: a series of 318 sketches that became cult, where the two authors-directors overdubbed 1970s executives from real corporate films. Featuring in particular Jean-Christian Ranu, Didier Leguélec and other Berthier, fictional characters of a gray and bureaucratic world, symbolized by their fetish company, the COGIP.

They signed the film adaptation (screenplay and dialogue) of Frédéric Beigbeder's novel 99 francs and directed Le Bureau for Canal +, adapted from the British TV series The Office, starring François Berléand.

In 2007, they wrote and directed their first feature film, Me Two, a comedy starring Daniel Auteuil, Alain Chabat and Marina Foïs, produced by Alain Chabat (Chez Wam, released on June 18, 2008).

In October 2008, they wrote and directed the music-video, Figures Imposed, for Julien Doré. Figures Imposed was describes as a 'super kitsch' leap somewhere between Fame and Dirty Dancing, with Catherine Deneuve, Eglantine Rembauville, Clément Sibony and Christian Morin.

In May 2009, they directed a for-profit humanitarian music-video in favor of the traders in difficulty: Save The Traders, shot with thirty real traders from international market places.

On July 7. 2009, Canal + gives them a carte blanche for an all-night show, The Night of COGIP, on the occasion of the first broadcast of their feature film, Me Two. A six-hour program live from the headquarters of COGIP, with many Message à caractère informatif, office musicals, economic telenovelas, a making of the Message à caractère informatif, exclusive lives, office dance classes, an American series, and an interview with Christophe Dejours.

On July 10, 2013 they released their second feature film for cinema as writers and directors: The Big Bad Wolf, a very personal reading of the famous traditional tale The Three Little Pigs starring Benoît Poelvoorde, Fred Testot, Kad Merad, Charlotte Le Bon, Valérie Donzelli, Zabou Breitman and Léa Drucker, produced by Eric Altmayer and Nicolas Altmayer (Mandarin Cinema).

On November 4, 2014, as part of its 30th anniversary, Canal Plus ordered original programs to some of its historical key figures. The channel offered Nicolas & Bruno to make a feature film about Porn, one of the cornerstones of the famous encrypted channel's heyday. After that they created In Search of The Ultra-Sex a 62 minutes overdubbed mach-up movie based on the same principle as Message à caractère informatif. A hilarious comedy where the two directors perform all voices, providing editing, sound effects, etc. A film produced by Arno Moria and David Frenkel (Synecdoche Films, Paris). But the fate of the film went far beyond a special TV broadcast and met an unexpected success in France.

On November 6 and 10, 2014, they were invited by Palais de Tokyo for 2 evenings dedicated to their works. Two previews of In Search of The Ultra-Sex followed up with a Master Class before an audience of 450 people.

On December 11, 2014, the ARP (Actors, Directors and Producers Corporation) headed by Michel Hazanavicius organised a double special screening of Michel Hazanavicius's La Classe américaine and a new version of the Ultra-Sex for theatres.

In March 2015, the Festival International du Film de Fribourg featured the film in their Midnight Screenings. Nicolas & Bruno provided additional experiences for the attendees, with choreography of Daft-Peunk Robot (a character of the film) and a workshop where the public can come and try dubbing extracts of the Ultra-Sex. This is the beginning of a great tour: the Ultra-Sex-Tour. It was also featured in several other French theatres such as Lyon (outdoors at Transborder), Amiens, Poitiers, Marseilles, Metz, Montpellier, Villeneuve d'Ascq, Gueret, Lausanne, Avignon, Dunkerque, Toulouse, and the Luminor.

On June 5, 2015, an event was organized around the film at the mythical The Max Linder Panorama cinema, with animation provided by the two directors, the projection of the Message à caractère informatif fake making-of, and dubbing demonstration live by the famous French porn star Tabatha Cash and dubbing French actors Patrick Poivey (Bruce Willis) Lionel Henry (Eddie Murphy) Eric Missoffe (Scooby-Doo) and Gilbert Levy (Moe  The Simpsons ), in front of 650 people. It was a sold out event.

On September 30, 2015 In Search Of The Ultra-Sex (subtitled version of A Research of Ultra-Sex) is projected in United States in Austin (Texas) at the famous Fantastic Fest where it has been selected, and then on October 3 at the American Cinematheque, in the famous Grauman's Egyptian Theatre, during the Beyond Fest. The film was also selected by the Ithaca International Film Festival of New York, the Grolandais International Film Festival of Toulouse, the Buttocks Film Festival of Paris (as closing film), the Bordeaux Independent International Film Festival, the Französische Filmtage Tübingen of Stuttgart and the Zinema Zombie Fest of Bogota, for exceptional midnight screenings out of competition with the intervention of the directors.

In October 2015, the mythical Parisian theater Studio Galande featured In Search of the Ultra-Sex.

On October 30, 2015, Vampires in privacy, the French version of Taika Waititi and Jemaine Clement's mockumentary What We Do In The Shadows, was released digitally. Wild Bunch gave Nicolas & Bruno a carte blanche for the adaptation: a completely rewritten "French Version Originale", both faithful and nuts, for which French actors Alexandre Astier, Fred Testot, Bruno Salomone, Julie Ferrier, Zabou Breitman and Jeremie Elkaïm join the two dubbers-authors' voices.

Filmography

Authors and directors

Cinema 
 2008: Me Two  (with Daniel Auteuil, Alain Chabat, Marina Fois)
 2013: The Big Bad Wolf (with Benoît Poelvoorde, Fred Testot, Kad Merad and Charlotte Le Bon)
 2015: Vampires in privacy (screenplay and directing of the What We Do In The Shadows French Version, with the voices of Alexandre Astier, Fred Testot, Bruno Salomone, Julie Ferrier, Zabou Breitman, Jeremie Elkaïm and Nicolas & Bruno)
 2015: In Search of The Ultra-Sex (with the voices of Nicolas & Bruno)

Television 
 1997- 1998: Amour, gloire et débats d'idées 
 1998 - 2000: Message a Caractère Informatif 
 2002: Restauratec  (with Alain Chabat, Gérard Jugnot, Marina Fois, Helena Noguerra)
 2004: Behind the scenes of Message a Caractère Informatif
 2006: Le Bureau  (French version of Ricky Gervais's The Office)
 2009: The Night of COGIP 
 2009: The Labor nowadays: assessment and prospects  (documentary with Christophe Dejours)
 2009: Save the Traders  (advertising)
 2014: Message of Pornographic Nature : In Search of ultra-sex

Music videos 
 2008: Figures Imposées (with Julien Doré, Catherine Deneuve, Eglantine Rembauville, Clément Sibony and Christian Morin)
 2009 Save The Traders

Cinema scriptwriters 
 2007: 99 francs 
 2008: Me Two 
 2013: The Big Bad Wolf
 2014: 99 Rubles The ideal
 2015: In Search of the Ultra-Sex
 2015: Vampires in privacy (writing and dialogues of the French version)

Voices 
 1997- 1998: Amour, gloire et débats d'idées: all characters
 1998 - 2000: Message a Caractère Informatif: all characters
 2002: Restauratec : all characters
 2003: COGIP 2000  (with Gilles Gaston-Dreyfus): all the characters
 2004: Behind the scenes of Message a Caractère Informatif: all the characters
 2006: Le Bureau (The Office): Journalists
 2008: Me Two : Jean-Jacques Style, journalist and women's choirs
 2009: The Night of COGIP 
 2009: The Labor nowadays: assessment and prospects (documentary with Christophe Dejours): Journalist
 2015: Vampires in privacy: Aymeric, Gilles, different voices.
 2015: In Search of the Ultra-Sex: all characters

References

External links 
 
 

French film directors
French screenwriters